Abdul Rahman Khan was an Azad Kashmiri politician who served as interim President of Azad Kashmir from 7 October 1969 to 30 October 1970 and again from 1983 to 1985.

References

Presidents of Azad Kashmir
Possibly living people
Year of birth missing